Belvidere is a town and the county seat of Warren County, in the U.S. state of New Jersey. As of the 2020 United States census, the town's population was 2,520, a decrease of 161 (−6.0%) from the 2010 census count of 2,681, which in turn reflected a decline of 90 (−3.2%) from the 2,771 counted at the 2000 census. 

Belvidere was incorporated as a town by an act of the New Jersey Legislature on April 7, 1845, from portions of Oxford Township, based on the results of a referendum held that day. The town's name means "beautiful to see" in Italian.

Geography and climate
According to the U.S. Census Bureau, the town had a total area of 1.48 square miles (3.84 km2), including 1.45 square miles (3.75 km2) of land and 0.04 square miles (0.09 km2) of water (2.36%).

Belvidere borders White Township in Warren County and Northampton County in Pennsylvania across the Delaware River.

Demographics

2010 census

The Census Bureau's 2006–2010 American Community Survey showed that (in 2010 inflation-adjusted dollars) median household income was $60,707 (with a margin of error of +/− $10,476) and the median family income was $74,028 (+/− $13,366). Males had a median income of $53,796 (+/− $11,432) versus $32,000 (+/− $7,359) for females. The per capita income for the town was $28,220 (+/− $2,359). About 0.8% of families and 2.3% of the population were below the poverty line, including none of those under age 18 and 2.9% of those age 65 or over.

2000 censu
As of the 2000 U.S. Census, there were 2,771 people, 1,088 households, and 716 families residing in the town. The population density was 2,091.7 people per square mile (810.5/km2). There were 1,165 housing units at an average density of 879.4 per square mile (340.8/km2). The racial makeup of the town was 98.02% White, 0.51% African American, 0.04% Native American, 0.51% Asian, 0.25% from other races, and 0.69% from two or more races. Hispanic or Latino of any race were 2.31% of the population.

There were 1,088 households, out of which 36.4% had children under the age of 18 living with them, 52.0% were married couples living together, 9.7% had a female householder with no husband present, and 34.1% were non-families. 28.5% of all households were made up of individuals, and 11.1% had someone living alone who was 65 years of age or older. The average household size was 2.54 and the average family size was 3.17.

In the town, the population was spread out, with 28.1% under the age of 18, 6.1% from 18 to 24, 32.2% from 25 to 44, 20.7% from 45 to 64, and 12.8% who were 65 years of age or older. The median age was 36 years. For every 100 females, there were 92.0 males. For every 100 females age 18 and over, there were 88.5 males.

The median income for a household in the town was $52,792, and the median income for a family was $62,212. Males had a median income of $41,800 versus $31,444 for females. The per capita income for the town was $23,231. About 1.3% of families and 3.4% of the population were below the poverty line, including 0.4% of those under age 18 and 10.4% of those age 65 or over.

Economy
A large site of DSM Nutritional Products that includes  of facilities in the town, manufacturing products including arachidonic acid and beta-carotene by fermentation processes, is located on the town's border with White Township.

Government

Local government
Belvidere is governed under the Town form of municipal government. The town is one of nine municipalities (of the 564) statewide that use this traditional form of government. The governing body is comprised of the Mayor and the six-member Town Council , with all positions elected at-large on a partisan basis as part of the November general election. A Mayor is elected directly by the voters to a four-year term of office. The Town Council consists of six members elected to serve three-year terms on a staggered basis, with two seats coming up for election each year in a three-year cycle.

, the Mayor of Belvidere is Republican Joseph M. Kennedy Sr., whose term of office ends December 31, 2023. Members of the Town Council are Council President Laurel Napolitani (R, 2023), Glen E. Matlock (R, 2022; elected to serve an unexpired term), Kathleen Miers (R, 2023), Donald Mitchell (R, 2022), Joseph Roth (R, 2024) and Adam Zmigrodski (R, 2024).

Glen Matlock was elected in November 2020 to serve the term of office expiring in December 2022 that had been held by Charles A. Makatura Jr. until he resigned from office in January 2020.

In March 2015, the Town Council selected Timothy Petre from three candidates nominated by the Republican municipal committee to fill the seat expiring in December 2017 that had been held by William J. Murphy until he resigned from office. Petre served on an interim basis until the November 2015 general election, when Laurel Napolitani was elected to serve the balance of the term of office.

In December 2014, the Town Council selected Laurel Napolitani from among three names nominated by the Republican municipal committee to fill the term expiring in December 2016 that had been held by Michael Viglianco, who resigned from council in December 2014 after moving out of Belvidere. Napolitani served on an interim basis until the November 2015 general election, when Walter Tutka was elected to serve the balance of the term of office.

Federal, state, and county representation
Belvidere is located in the 7th Congressional District and is part of New Jersey's 24th state legislative district. 

Prior to the 2011 reapportionment following the 2010 Census, Belvidere had been in the 23rd state legislative district.

Politics
As of March 2011, there were a total of 1,687 registered voters in Belvidere, of which 380 (22.5% vs. 21.5% countywide) were registered as Democrats, 611 (36.2% vs. 35.3%) were registered as Republicans and 694 (41.1% vs. 43.1%) were registered as Unaffiliated. There were 2 voters registered as either Libertarians or Greens. Among the town's 2010 Census population, 62.9% (vs. 62.3% in Warren County) were registered to vote, including 84.3% of those ages 18 and over (vs. 81.5% countywide).

In the 2012 presidential election, Republican Mitt Romney received 656 votes (53.8% vs. 56.0% countywide), ahead of Democrat Barack Obama with 521 votes (42.7% vs. 40.8%) and other candidates with 24 votes (2.0% vs. 1.7%), among the 1,220 ballots cast by the town's 1,724 registered voters, for a turnout of 70.8% (vs. 66.7% in Warren County). In the 2008 presidential election, Republican John McCain received 693 votes (55.0% vs. 55.2% countywide), ahead of Democrat Barack Obama with 514 votes (40.8% vs. 41.4%) and other candidates with 27 votes (2.1% vs. 1.6%), among the 1,260 ballots cast by the town's 1,684 registered voters, for a turnout of 74.8% (vs. 73.4% in Warren County). In the 2004 presidential election, Republican George W. Bush received 779 votes (61.9% vs. 61.0% countywide), ahead of Democrat John Kerry with 452 votes (35.9% vs. 37.2%) and other candidates with 21 votes (1.7% vs. 1.3%), among the 1,259 ballots cast by the town's 1,640 registered voters, for a turnout of 76.8% (vs. 76.3% in the whole county).

In the 2013 gubernatorial election, Republican Chris Christie received 68.3% of the vote (494 cast), ahead of Democrat Barbara Buono with 27.0% (195 votes), and other candidates with 4.7% (34 votes), among the 740 ballots cast by the town's 1,758 registered voters (17 ballots were spoiled), for a turnout of 42.1%. In the 2009 gubernatorial election, Republican Chris Christie received 480 votes (56.7% vs. 61.3% countywide), ahead of Democrat Jon Corzine with 221 votes (26.1% vs. 25.7%), Independent Chris Daggett with 116 votes (13.7% vs. 9.8%) and other candidates with 18 votes (2.1% vs. 1.5%), among the 847 ballots cast by the town's 1,642 registered voters, yielding a 51.6% turnout (vs. 49.6% in the county).

Education
The Belvidere School District serves students in pre-kindergarten through twelfth grade. As of the 2020–21 school year, the district, comprised of two schools, had an enrollment of 631 students and 61.5 classroom teachers (on an FTE basis), for a student–teacher ratio of 10.3:1. Schools in the district (with 2020–21 enrollment data from the National Center for Education Statistics) are Oxford Street Elementary School with 262 students in grades PreK-8, and Belvidere High School with 367 students in grades 9-12. As part of a cost-saving measure, Third Street School was closed after the 2018–2019 school year and merged into Oxford Street Elementary School. Students from Harmony Township, Hope Township and White Township attend the district's high school as part of sending/receiving relationships with the respective districts.

Students from the town and from all of Warren County are eligible to attend Ridge and Valley Charter School in Blairstown (for grades K–8) or Warren County Technical School in Washington borough (for 9–12), with special education services provided by local districts supplemented throughout the county by the Warren County Special Services School District in Oxford Township (for Pre-K–12).

Belvidere was rated one of the Top 5 Schools in each county with the highest rate of drug/violence/bullying incidents, based on the number of incidents per every 100 enrolled students.

Transportation

No Interstate, U.S. or State highways pass through Belvidere. The most prominent highway is County Route 620.

The Riverton–Belvidere Bridge crosses the Delaware River, connecting Belvidere with Riverton, Pennsylvania, operated by the Delaware River Joint Toll Bridge Commission. There is no toll for crossing on either side, after tolls were abolished by the Joint Commission for the Elimination of Toll Bridges in 1929.

Notable people

People who were born in, residents of, or otherwise closely associated with Belvidere include:

 Donald J. Albanese (born 1937), politician who served in the New Jersey General Assembly from 1976 to 1982
 C. Ledyard Blair (1867–1949), investment banker and yachtsman
 DeWitt Clinton Blair (1833–1915), philanthropist and industrialist
 Charles W. Buttz (1837–1913), member of the United States House of Representatives from South Carolina
 Dan Gray (born 1956), former NFL defensive tackle who played for the Detroit Lions in 1978
 Henry S. Harris (1850–1902), former U.S. Member of Congress
 Don Hume (born 1938), former NASCAR driver who competed in 15 Winston Cup events
 Joseph Johnson (1785–1877), former Member of Congress and Governor of Virginia
 John Patterson Bryan Maxwell (1804–1845), politician who represented New Jersey in the United States House of Representatives from 1837 to 1839 and again from 1841 to 1843
 William McMurtrie (1851–1913), chemist who served as president of the American Chemical Society
 Don Reitz (1929–2014), ceramic artist, recognized for inspiring a reemergence of salt glaze pottery in the United States
 Ernest Schelling (1876–1939), pianist, composer, conductor and music director who was the conductor of the Baltimore Symphony Orchestra from 1935 to 1937
 Melville Amasa Scovell (1855–1912), chemist 
 George W. Scranton (1811–1861), former member of Congress and founder of the city of Scranton
 Chris Wylde (born 1976), actor and comedian

Places of interest

 Belvidere Cemetery – Dating back to 1834, the cemetery is the burial site of several historical figures, many associated with the Civil War, and has been included in tours conducted as part of the town's annual Victorian Days celebration.
 Four Sisters Winery – Established in 1984, the winery was named for the four daughters of the founders.
 Robert Morris House – Built by Robert Morris, a signer of the Declaration of Independence, the house is one of the town's oldest homes.
 Warren County Courthouse – Future New Jersey governor-elect Garret D. Wall (who declined to serve as governor after being elected in 1829) donated the land in 1825 and the courthouse was completed in 1826 at a cost of $10,000. In 1892, the courthouse was the site of the county's most recent public hanging.
 Warren County Museum – Now the home of the Warren County Historical and Genealogical Society, the museum is located on Garret D. Wall county square in a townhome constructed  and purchased in 1980  which now store many items related to the history of Warren County.
 Wyckoff's Christmas Tree Farm – An ample supply of both cut-your-own and fresh cut Christmas trees available. Wyckoff's starts the season with approximately 5,000 trees available including: Douglas Fir, Fraser Fir, Blue Spruce, Norway Spruce & Concolor Fir. Opening on or about Nov. 25 through Dec. 24, 8 am – 4:30 pm.

References

External links

 Belvidere Town website
 History of Belvidere, New Jersey

 
1845 establishments in New Jersey
County seats in New Jersey
Populated places established in 1845
Town form of New Jersey government
Towns in Warren County, New Jersey
New Jersey populated places on the Delaware River